Karne Prabhakar (born 1970) is an Indian politician and politburo member of Telangana Rashtra Samithi.

Early life
He was born in Samsthan Narayanpur, Nalgonda District. His father was a government school teacher and his mother was a farmer. He did his schooling at his village, intermediate first year in Hyderabad and second year in Bhongir. He graduated in BA from S.L.N.S. Degree College, Bhongir in 1991. He did his Diploma in Journalism. He started a students organization, Telangana Vidyarthi Sangam in college as a sympathizer for Telangana. He joined Telangana Maha Sabha, an organization for achieving Telangana State in 1996.

Career
He entered journalism by working as a freelancer and in 1995-96 worked with Gemini TV as a contributor. In 1991, he entered business in earth moving excavator Contractor and was successful.

Political career
He was inspired by K. Chandrashekar Rao for attainment of statehood for Telangana and joined TRS as founder member in 2001. He worked as youth president, General Secretary, spokesman in the party.

Karne Prabhakar contested as MLA candidate in 2004 for TRS but lost the election.

He is an MLC of Telangana Assembly and was youth wing state president of TRS party.
He is one of the key members in TRS. He speaks well and handles situations with sensibility. He is as MLC on Telangana Rashtra Samithi ticket. Previously, he worked as in charge for LB Nagar Constituency.

He is MLC in governor quota from 2014 to 2020-08-20.

References

Telangana Rashtra Samithi politicians
Telugu people
Living people
People from Telangana
1970 births